In mathematics, the polynomial method is an algebraic approach to combinatorics problems that involves capturing some combinatorial structure using polynomials and proceeding to argue about their algebraic properties. Recently, the polynomial method has led to the development of remarkably simple solutions to several long-standing open problems.  The polynomial method encompasses a wide range of specific techniques for using polynomials and ideas from areas such as algebraic geometry to solve combinatorics problems.  While a few techniques that follow the framework of the polynomial method, such as Alon's Combinatorial Nullstellensatz, have been known since the 1990s, it was not until around 2010 that a broader framework for the polynomial method has been developed.

Mathematical overview 
Many uses of the polynomial method follow the same high-level approach.  The approach is as follows:

 Embed some combinatorial problem into a vector space. 
 Capture the hypotheses of the problem by constructing a polynomial of low-degree that is zero on a certain set
 After constructing the polynomial, argue about its algebraic properties to deduce that the original configuration must satisfy the desired properties.

Example 
As an example, we outline Dvir's proof of the Finite Field Kakeya Conjecture using the polynomial method.

Finite Field Kakeya Conjecture: Let  be a finite field with  elements. Let  be a Kakeya set, i.e. for each vector there exists  such that  contains a line .

Proof:  The proof we give will show that  has size at least .  The bound of  can be obtained using the same method with a little additional work.

Assume we have a Kakeya set  with

Consider the set of monomials of the form  of degree exactly . There are exactly  such monomials. Note this is because finding such a polynomial reduces to solving a system of  linear equations for the coefficients.

Clearly . Since  is homogeneous, if  for some  then  for any . In particular

for all nonzero .  However,  is a polynomial of degree  in  but it has at least  roots corresponding to the nonzero elements of  so it must be identically zero.  In particular, plugging in  we deduce .

We deduce that we must actually have

Polynomial partitioning 
A variation of the polynomial method, often called polynomial partitioning, was introduced by Guth and Katz in their solution to the Erdős distinct distances problem. Polynomial partitioning involves using polynomials to divide the underlying space into regions and arguing about the geometric structure of the partition.  These arguments rely on results from algebraic geometry bounding the number of incidences between various algebraic curves.  The technique of polynomial partitioning has been used to give a new proof of the Szemerédi–Trotter theorem via the polynomial ham sandwich theorem and has been applied to a variety of problems in incidence geometry.

Applications 
A few examples of longstanding open problems that have been solved using the polynomial method are:

 The finite field Kakeya conjecture by Dvir
 The Erdős distinct distances problem by Guth and Katz
The Joints Problem in 3D by Guth and Katz. Their argument was later simplified by Elekes, Kaplan and Sharir

See also 
Combinatorial Nullstellensatz

References

External links 
Survey on the Polynomial Method by Terence Tao
Survey on the Polynomial Method by Larry Guth

Combinatorics